Paul Bradshaw may refer to:
 Paul Bradshaw (footballer, born 1953), English former professional football midfielder
 Paul Bradshaw (footballer, born 1956), English former professional football goalkeeper
 Paul Bradshaw (journalist), British online journalist, blogger, and journalism academic
 Paul Bradshaw (television), British television writer director and producer
 Paul Bradshaw (cricketer) (born 1978), English cricketer
 Paul F. Bradshaw, British professor of liturgy at the University of Notre Dame
 Paul Bradshaw, founder and editor of British music magazine publication Straight No Chaser